Evening Telegraph is a common newspaper name, and may refer to:

 Evening Telegraph (Dundee), Scotland
 Evening Telegraph (Dublin), Ireland, published 1871–1924.
 Coventry Evening Telegraph, England, now the Coventry Telegraph
 Derby Evening Telegraph, England, now the Derby Telegraph
 Northamptonshire Evening Telegraph, England
 Peterborough Evening Telegraph, Cambridgeshire, England
 Philadelphia Evening Telegraph, Pennsylvania, United States, published 1864–1918
 The Evening Telegraph (Charters Towers), Queensland, Australia, published 1901–1921

See also
 Telegraph (disambiguation)
 The Telegraph (disambiguation)
 Morning Telegraph

Lists of newspapers